Ludovic Payen (born 18 February 1995 in Vernon) is a French athlete specialising in the high hurdles. He won a gold medal at the 2017 European U23 Championships.

His personal bests are 13.38 seconds in the 110 metres hurdles (+1.1 m/s, Bonneuil-sur-Marne 2018) and 7.66 seconds in the 60 metres hurdles (Liévin 2018).

International competitions

References

1995 births
Living people
French male hurdlers
Sportspeople from Eure
Competitors at the 2019 Summer Universiade
20th-century French people
21st-century French people